Granata japonica is a species of sea snail, a marine gastropod mollusk in the family Chilodontidae.

Description
(Original description by Adams) The brown, convex, imperforate shell has a suborbicular shape. It is transversely costulate. The riblets are close-set, and noduled. The interstices are very finely longitudinally striated. The spire is rather prominent. The rounded whorls are costate. The subcircular aperture is pearly within.

Distribution
This marine species occurs off Japan.

References

External links
 To Encyclopedia of Life
 To World Register of Marine Species

japonica
Gastropods described in 1850